William Wright Faison House, also known as Friendship Plantation, is a historic plantation house located near Bowdens, Duplin County, North Carolina. It was built about 1852, and is a two-story, three bay by two bay, Greek Revival style frame dwelling. It features a tall portico supported by four paneled posts added about 1848. Also on the property is a contributing one-story school building (c. 1830).  The house was the seat of a 3,500 acre plantation amassed by William Wright Faison before the American Civil War.

It was listed on the National Register of Historic Places in 2004.

References

Plantation houses in North Carolina
Houses on the National Register of Historic Places in North Carolina
Greek Revival houses in North Carolina
Houses completed in 1852
Houses in Duplin County, North Carolina
National Register of Historic Places in Duplin County, North Carolina
1852 establishments in North Carolina